Scotch Tape is a brand name used for pressure-sensitive tapes manufactured by 3M. Their magnetic recording tape products were also sold under the Scotch brand.

History 

In 1930,  Richard Drew, a 3M engineer, developed the first transparent sticky tape in St. Paul, Minnesota with  material known as cellophane. Drew's inspiration came from watching auto-engineers try to achieve smooth paintings on two-color cars. It was then that he created Scotch masking tape, and later evolved the product to be transparent. In 1932, John A. Borden, also a 3M engineer, built the tape dispenser. During the Great Depression, the versatility and durability of Scotch tape led to a surge in demand, as customers used it to mend household items like books, curtains, clothing, etc. It had industrial applications as well: Goodyear used it to tape the inner supportive ribs of dirigibles to prevent corrosion.

Trade names 

Although it is a trademark and a brand name, Scotch tape is sometimes used as a generic term. The Scotch brand includes many different constructions (backings, adhesives, etc.) and colors of tape.

The use of the term Scotch in the name was a pejorative meaning "parsimonious" in the 1920s and 1930s. The brand name Scotch came about around 1925 while Richard Drew was testing his first masking tape to determine how much adhesive he needed to add. The bodyshop painter became frustrated with the sample masking tape and exclaimed, "Take this tape back to those Scotch bosses of yours and tell them to put more adhesive on it!" The name was soon applied to the entire line of 3M tapes.

Scotty McTape, a kilt-wearing cartoon boy, was the brand's mascot for two decades, first appearing in 1944. The familiar tartan design, a take on the well-known Wallace tartan, was introduced in 1945.

The Scotch brand, Scotch Tape and Magic Tape are registered trademarks of 3M. Besides using Scotch as a prefix in its brand names (Scotchgard, Scotchlite, and Scotch-Brite), the company also used the Scotch name for its (mainly professional) audiovisual magnetic tape products, until the early 1990s when the tapes were branded solely with the 3M logo. In 1996, 3M exited the magnetic tape business, selling its assets to Quantegy (which is a spin-off of Ampex).

In the late 1960s, the Scotch theme was also applied to 3M's all-weather polyurethane Tartan track and the company's artificial grass, Tartan Turf.

Magic tape
Magic Tape, also known as Magic Transparent Tape, is a brand within the Scotch Tape family of adhesive tapes made by 3M, sold in distinctive plaid packaging.

Invented and introduced in 1961, it is the original matte finish tape. It appears frosty on the roll, yet is invisible on paper.   This quality makes it popular for gift-wrapping. 
Magic Tape can be written upon with pen, pencil, or marker; comes in permanent and removable varieties; and resists drying out and yellowing.

In Japan, "Magic Tape" is a trademark of Kuraray for a hook-and-loop fastener system similar to Velcro. Instead the katakana version of the word Mending Tape is used, i.e., along with the familiar green and yellow tartan branding.

X-rays 
In 1953, Soviet scientists showed that triboluminescence caused by peeling a roll of an unidentified Scotch brand tape in a vacuum can produce X-rays. In 2008, American scientists performed an experiment that showed the rays can be strong enough to leave an X-ray image of a finger on photographic paper.

See also 
 Duct tape
 Pressure-sensitive tape
 Sellotape
 Velostat
 List of adhesive tapes

References

External links 

 Scotch Tape in MNopedia, the Minnesota Encyclopedia
 History of Cellophane Tape and the Scotch Brand
 Scotch 75th Anniversary—Pages with history information and old commercials featuring Scotty McTape
 Scotch-tape.co.uk—Official website for the UK
 Scotchtape.com—Official website for the USA
 Ambidextrousmag.org—A brief history of tape

3M brands
Adhesive tape
American inventions
Brands that became generic
Office equipment
Products introduced in 1930